Thelwall railway station was a station to the south of Stockport Road A56 road, Thelwall, England, at the junction of St Helens Railway and Warrington and Stockport Railway. It opened in June 1854; and it closed to passengers on 17 September 1956. Both railways were absorbed by the LNWR; the station was on the southmost Liverpool to Manchester line.

References

Sources

External links
 Thelwall at Disused Stations

Disused railway stations in Warrington
Former London and North Western Railway stations
Railway stations in Great Britain opened in 1854
Railway stations in Great Britain closed in 1956